The Monument to Karl Marx in Moscow was a monument built in 1962 by Soviet sculptor Lev Kerbel, it was located near the Bolshoi Theatre in Theatre Square.

The monument was weighing 160 tons is made of a monolithic block of gray granite, mined near Dnepropetrovsk (now Dnipro, Ukraine) in the Kudashevsky minequarry. Marx is depicted as a speaker standing on the podium, as if addressing the working people with a speech. The monument is decorated bearing the motto of the USSR "Proletarians of All Countries, Unite!" At the front. The sculptural composition is complemented by two granite pylons on both sides of the monument. One of them is carved with the words of Friedrich Engels, said at Marx's funeral: "His name and deed will outlive for centuries"; on the other - Lenin's phrase "The teaching of Marx is omnipotent because it is true."

History 
At the beginning of 1957, a new open all-Union competition was held for the best project for a monument to Marx; its winner was a creative team led by sculptor Lev Kerbel. The grand opening of the monument took place on October 29, 1961, during the days of the XXII Congress of the CPSU in the presence of the top party and Soviet leadership, congress delegates, guests from the communist parties of other countries.

In popular culture 
On the opening credits of 1988 action film Red Heat, the monument in wintertime, stood covering most of the foundations.

References 

Sculptures of men in Russia
Sculptures in the Soviet Union
Statues in Russia
Cultural depictions of Karl Marx
Granite sculptures in Russia
Cultural heritage monuments of federal significance in Moscow
Monuments and memorials in Moscow